The JAAGO Foundation (বাংলা: জাগো ফাউন্ডেশন) is a civil society organization established in April 2007, in Bangladesh. The Foundation work towards the betterment of people living below the poverty line. The JAAGO Foundation currently has schools spread all over Bangladesh catering free of cost schools for 4,500 underprivileged children. One of JAAGO major annual events is the 'Universal Children's Day'. The foundation has more than 50,000 volunteers via its volunteer platform 'Volunteer for Bangladesh' who celebrate this day by raising awareness for children's rights.

History
In April 2007, Korvi Rakshand, a law school student, started a movement with some friends to distribute relief to the flood victims at the slums of Rayer Bazaar in Dhaka city. Later he expanded this program to establish the JAAGO Foundation with the hope of 'breaking the cycle of poverty through education'. Although JAAGO originally started out by providing free of cost primary school education to the children of Rayer Bazaar, Dhaka it slowly started to expand its activities all over Bangladesh.

Activities

JAAGO Foundation School
In 2007, the JAAGO Foundation started its school with 17 children on a piece of carpet and a whiteboard. It has now expanded to 11 fully functional branches and over 4,000 students. The JAAGO School is the first of its kind to provide free of cost education of international standards to the destitute children of Bangladesh. The primary course of instruction is English although students are also taught Bangla to have a very strong background in Bengali.

In September 2011, JAAGO Foundation began its first digital school as a pilot program.

Other activities

Volunteer For Bangladesh
Through Volunteer for Bangladesh, JAAGO Foundation, for the first time in Bangladesh, provided the youth with a voice and a platform. This concern of JAAGO Foundation is a nationwide association of Volunteer Action Groups that work for the betterment of their individual communities and the nation as a whole. Volunteer for Bangladesh plans to establish Volunteer Action Groups around 64 districts of Bangladesh.

International operations
JAAGO has now opened supporting branches in U.S., UK, Canada and Australia. Most of these branches are operated by native nationals who once worked as volunteers for JAAGO.

Awards
 Arthakantha Business Award (2010) – Best CSR Performance Award
 Mosaic Talent Award 2010 – Mosaic International Award
 - Commonwealth Youth Awards 2013

References

External links
 

Youth empowerment organizations
Educational organisations based in Bangladesh
Organizations established in 2007